Kilat is a Hiligaynon and Cebuano word which means "lightning".

Kilat may also refer to:
 León Kilat, a revolutionary leader in Cebu during the Philippine Revolution against Spain
 Junior Kilat, a Filipino reggae band
Kilat Serrada, a Filipino martial art founded by Roy Sevilla Garciano

See also
 24 Kilates, an album released in 1993 by Mexican singer Paulina Rubio

 the kilt and Guntur. Is lightning and thunder